Sharonov, feminine: Sharonova  is a Russian surname that may refer to:

 Nikolai Sharonov (1901-?), Soviet diplomat
 Roman Sharonov (born 1976), Russian footballer
 Vsevolod Sharonov (1901–1964), a Russian astronomer
 Yevgeny Sharonov (born 1958), a Russian water polo player
 Aleksandr Sharonov (born 1942) Mordvin (Russian) philologist, writer

Russian-language surnames